Maurice Rodney "Mardy" Collins (born August 4, 1984) is an American former professional basketball player. He completed his college basketball career at Temple University, and was drafted by the New York Knicks with the 29th pick of the first round of the 2006 NBA draft. Collins played for the Knicks for two seasons and then played for the Los Angeles Clippers from 2008 to 2010. Since 2011, Collins has played in various international leagues.

High school career
Collins attended Simon Gratz High School in Philadelphia, as did NBA players Aaron McKie and Rasheed Wallace.

College career
Scouts were impressed by Collins' defense and team play. He totaled 89 steals for his 2005–06 season at Temple University, primarily by stepping into passing lanes. He also averaged 16.9 points per game, 4.7 rebounds per game, and 4.0 assists per game.

Professional career

New York Knicks
In 52 games played during the 2006–2007 season, Collins averaged 4.5 points per game, 2.0 rebounds per game, and 1.6 assists per game. However, in the final ten games of the season, when he played a substantially higher number of minutes than previously in the season, he averaged 14.7 points, 6.3 rebounds, 5.8 assists and 1.9 steals.

On December 16, 2006, during the fourth quarter of a game between the New York Knicks and Denver Nuggets, Collins committed a hard foul against Nuggets guard J. R. Smith. The ensuing confrontation resulted in a brawl, after which all ten players on the floor at the time were ejected. Collins received a six-game suspension.

He played a career-high 51 minutes on April 7, 2007 against the Milwaukee Bucks, scoring 19 points in addition to 12 rebounds, 8 assists, and 5 steals.

Los Angeles Clippers
On November 21, 2008, Collins and Zach Randolph were traded to the Los Angeles Clippers for Tim Thomas and Cuttino Mobley.

Los Angeles D-Fenders
Collins became a member of the Los Angeles D-Fenders on December 28, 2011.

International career
On January 17, 2011, Collins signed a one-year contract with the Turkish League team Bornova Belediye. In November 2012, he joined the Israeli team Maccabi Ashdod In May 2013, he signed with Guaros de Lara of the Venezuelan League. On August 26, 2013, he signed with Sutor Montegranaro of the Italian League.

On January 1, 2014, he signed a contract with the then reigning back-to-back EuroLeague champions, Olympiacos of the Greek League, until the end of the season. Over 14 EuroLeague games, in which he played as a bench player, he averaged 2.1 points, 1.6 rebounds, and 1.1 assists per game.

On September 26, 2014, he signed a contract with the Polish team Turów Zgorzelec, following the departure of Christian Eyenga from the team.

For the 2015–16 season, Collins signed with Strasbourg IG.

On July 27, 2016, Collins signed with PBC Lokomotiv-Kuban, for the 2016–17 season. On August 17, 2017, he re-signed with Lokomotiv for one more season.

The Basketball Tournament (TBT)
In the summer of 2017, Collins competed in The Basketball Tournament on ESPN for the City of Gods.  In their first-round matchup, Collins registered 10 points, eight rebounds and seven assists in the City of Gods' 88–86 loss to Gael Nation, a team composed of Iona College basketball alum.  Collins also competed in TBT during 2015.  That summer, Collins played one game for TYGTAL and totaled 18 points, 12 rebounds and nine assists.

Career statistics

NBA

Regular season

|-
| align="left" | 
| align="left" | New York
| 52 || 9 || 14.9 || .382 || .277 || .585 || 2.0 || 1.6 || .6 || .1 || 4.5
|-
| align="left" | 
| align="left" | New York
| 46 || 8 || 13.8 || .326 || .250 || .605 || 1.6 || 1.9 || .5 || .2 || 3.2
|-
| align="left" | 
| align="left" | New York
| 9 || 0 || 8.3 || .348 || .000 || .444 || .9 || 1.1 || .2 || .0 || 2.2
|-
| align="left" | 
| align="left" | L.A. Clippers
| 39 || 14 || 20.9 || .433 || .464 || .649 || 2.5 || 2.6 || .7 || .3 || 5.9
|-
| align="left" | 
| align="left" | L.A. Clippers
| 43 || 0 || 10.9 || .367 || .235 || .619 || 1.2 || 1.0 || .5 || .0 || 2.6
|- class="sortbottom"
| style="text-align:left;"| Career
| style="text-align:left;"|
| 189 || 31 || 14.7 || .380 || .299 || .599 || 1.8 || 1.7 || .6 || .1 || 3.9

EuroLeague

|-
| style="text-align:left;"| 2013–14
| style="text-align:left;"| Olympiacos
| 14 || 0 || 8.5 || .324 || .333 || .750 || 1.6 || 1.1 || .3 || .1 || 2.1 || 1.6
|-
| style="text-align:left;"| 2014–15
| style="text-align:left;"| Turów
| 8 || 6 || 30.1 || .418 || .231 || .524 || 4.4 || 3.9 || 1.9 || .3 || 12.4 || 12.9
|- class="sortbottom"
| style="text-align:left;"| Career
| style="text-align:left;"|
| 22 || 6 || 16.3 || .393 || .250 || .560 || 2.6 || 2.1 || .9 || .1 || 5.8 || 5.7

References

External links
 
 Mardy Collins at draftexpress.com
 Mardy Collins at esake.gr 
 Mardy Collins at eurobasket.com
 Mardy Collins at euroleague.net
 Mardy Collins at NBA.com
 Mardy Collins at fiba.com

1984 births
Living people
African-American basketball players
American expatriate basketball people in China
American expatriate basketball people in France
American expatriate basketball people in Greece
American expatriate basketball people in Israel
American expatriate basketball people in Italy
American expatriate basketball people in Poland
American expatriate basketball people in Russia
American expatriate basketball people in Turkey
American expatriate basketball people in Venezuela
American men's basketball players
Basketball players from Philadelphia
Bornova Belediye players
Guaros de Lara (basketball) players
Jiangsu Dragons players
Los Angeles Clippers players
Los Angeles D-Fenders players
Maccabi Ashdod B.C. players
New York Knicks draft picks
New York Knicks players
Olympiacos B.C. players
PBC Lokomotiv-Kuban players
Point guards
Shooting guards
SIG Basket players
Small forwards
Sutor Basket Montegranaro players
Temple Owls men's basketball players
Turów Zgorzelec players
21st-century African-American sportspeople
20th-century African-American people